Viorica Tonu (born 31 August 1996) is a Moldovan footballer who plays as a midfielder. She has been a member of the Moldova women's national team.

References

1996 births
Living people
Women's association football midfielders
Moldovan women's footballers
Moldova women's international footballers
FC Noroc Nimoreni players